Outré may refer to:

 Outré (Portal album), an album by Portal
 Outré (Jeff Schmidt album), an album by Jeff Schmidt

See also
 Outre-Mer (disambiguation)
 
 Loutre (disambiguation)